Rathin Kisku is an Indian singer. His style of music is between Baul and traditional Santal music, which earned him the nickname "adivasi Baul".

Life and work
Kisku was born in a Santal family in a small village near Santiniketan. The area is influenced by Rabindranath Tagore, who lived in Santiniketan. His former home is now a museum and attraction for tourists. Santinitekan is also considered one of the centers of Baul. During his school years, Kisku frequently participated in local cultural events. He dropped out of school without a degree, but was able to get vocal training in classical Hindustani. Kisku eventually pursued graduation from school. Kisku published his first CD in 2007 at the Goethe-Institut in Calcutta. Previously, he was the lead singer on the Ghosaldanga Bishnubati Adibasi Trust. Kisku has released more CDs with music publisher Saregama in India.

In Europe, he became known in 2005 due to a performance at ARTE. In 2005 and 2008, he undertook concert tours through (Germany) and Austria with the support of Martin Kämpchen. During the first of these trips, he also appeared on the Swiss radio DRS 2. In 2007, Kisku undertook a concert tour to Bangladesh, where he appeared in Dhaka together with Anusheh. This concert tour was again supported by the Goethe-Institut. In 2008, he was the main performer for the ceremony of the Santhali Filmfare Awards. Kisku has appeared repeatedly in Indian radio and television programs. The singer is married and lives in Bolpur.

With his fusion of traditional Santal music with more mainstream Indian music styles, Kisku is considered to be an example of a modern young Santal man balancing tradition with the demands of today.

Recently he performed in New Delhi in front of 10,000 people on 6 January 2019.

References

Living people
Indian male singers
1984 births
Santali people
Santali-language singers
Bengali musicians
Musicians from West Bengal